The Eglin Field Historic District is a U.S. historic district (designated as such on 22 October 1998) located near Fort Walton Beach, Florida. The district is on Eglin Air Force Base, and is bounded by Barranca, Choctawhatchee, 4th, and "F" Avenues. It contains 20 historic buildings.

References

External links
 Okaloosa County listings at National Register of Historic Places
 Virtual tour of Eglin Field at Eglin Air Force Base

Geography of Okaloosa County, Florida
Historic districts on the National Register of Historic Places in Florida
National Register of Historic Places in Okaloosa County, Florida